Rudik-e Sahebdad (also Romanized as Rūdīk-e Şāḩebdād; also known as Rūdīg-e Şāḩebdād and Rūdīk-e Pā’īn) is a village in Negur Rural District, Dashtiari District, Chabahar County, Sistan and Baluchestan Province, Iran. At the 2006 census, its population was 38, in 6 families.

References 

Populated places in Chabahar County
Sistan and Baluchestan Province